Passo is an extinct town in Benton County, in the U.S. state of Missouri. The GNIS classifies it as a populated place.

A post office called Passo was established in 1897, and remained in operation until 1908.  The name may be a transfer from El Paso, Texas.

References

Ghost towns in Missouri
Former populated places in Benton County, Missouri